Jevišovice is a town in Znojmo District in the South Moravian Region of the Czech Republic. It has about 1,100 inhabitants. The historic town centre is well preserved and is protected by law as an urban monument zone.

Geography
It lies in the Jevišovice Uplands. It is situated on the right bank of the Jevišovka River. The Jevišovice Reservoir is built on the river.

History
The first written mention of Jevišovice is from 1289. Until 1945, it was a town. In 2007, Jevišovice was restored the title of a town.

Sights

The most significant monument is the Old Castle. The original Gothic castle was baroque rebuilt by Jean-Louis Raduit de Souches in the first half of the 17th century. Today it is owned and administered by Moravské zemské muzeum in Brno and containts several expositions.

The New Castle was built by Jean-Louis Raduit de Souches in the early 1680s as a wooden Baroque hunting castle, and replaced in 1879 by the current structure. Today it houses a retirement house. It has a large castle park with 22 Baroque sculptures which is open to the public.

Notable people
Joann Venuto (1746–1833), painter

References

External links

Cities and towns in the Czech Republic
Populated places in Znojmo District